Robert L. Rock (September 8, 1927 – January 9, 2013) was an American politician who served as the Lieutenant Governor of Indiana from 1965 to 1969 and as the Mayor of Anderson, Indiana, from 1972 to 1980. He was the Democratic nominee for Governor of Indiana in 1968, but lost to Republican Edgar Whitcomb.

Early life
Born in Alexandria, Indiana, Rock grew up in Anderson, Indiana. He served in the United States Navy during World War II as a hospital corpsman at Balboa Naval Hospital in San Diego, California. He graduated from Indiana University with a degree in business in 1951.

Political career
In 1954, at the age of 26, Rock was elected to the Indiana House of Representatives as a Democrat serving in the 1955, 1959, 1961, and 1963 sessions. Then he served as Lieutenant Governor of Indiana from 1965 to 1969. In 1968, Rock won the Democratic nomination for Governor of Indiana, but lost the general election to Republican Secretary of State Edgar Whitcomb. He later served as Mayor of Anderson, Indiana from 1972 to 1980, where he established the Anderson Housing Authority Commission and the City of Anderson Transportation System (CATS).

Personal life
In 1956, he married Mary Jo Ferguson with whom he had four children and later nine grandchildren.

Death
Rock died in Fort Lauderdale, Florida, on January 9, 2013, at the age of 85.

References

1927 births
2013 deaths
Politicians from Anderson, Indiana
Indiana University alumni
Mayors of places in Indiana
Democratic Party members of the Indiana House of Representatives
Lieutenant Governors of Indiana
People from Alexandria, Indiana
Military personnel from Indiana